The Central Region is one of five regions of Malta. The region includes the central part of the main island of Malta. The region borders the Northern, Southern and South Eastern Regions.

It was created by the Act No. XVI of 2009 out of part of Malta Majjistral.

Subdivision

Districts
Central Region includes parts of the Northern Harbour and Western Districts.

Local councils
Central Region includes 13 local councils:
Attard - include the areas of Ħal Warda, Misraħ Kola, Sant'Anton and Ta' Qali. 
Balzan
Birkirkara - include the areas of Fleur-de-Lys, Swatar, Tal-Qattus, Ta' Paris and Mrieħel.
Gżira - include the area of Manoel Island 
Iklin
Lija - include the area of Tal-Mirakli 
Msida - include the areas of Swatar and Tal-Qroqq
Pietà - include the area of Gwardamanġa 
St. Julian's - include the areas of Paceville, Balluta Bay, St. George's Bay, and Ta' Ġiorni 
San Ġwann - include the areas of Kappara, Mensija, Misraħ Lewża and Ta' Żwejt. 
Santa Venera - include parts of Fleur-de-Lys and Mrieħel 
Sliema - include the areas of Savoy, Tigné, Qui-si-Sana and Fond Għadir 
Ta' Xbiex.

Regional Committee
The current Central Regional Committee is made up of:

References

External links

Regions of Malta
States and territories established in 2009
2009 establishments in Malta